Ron O'Brien may refer to:

 Ron O'Brien (coach), American diving coach
 Ron O'Brien (disc jockey) (1951–2008), American disc jockey 
 Ron O'Brien (footballer) (born 1942), Australian rules footballer for Richmond
 Ronnie O'Brien (born 1979), Irish footballer